Judo was contested at the 2019 Summer Universiade from 4 to 10 July 2019 at the Mostra d'Oltremare Pav. 6 in Naples.

Medal summary

Medal table

Men's events

Women's events

References

External links
 
 2019 Summer Universiade – Judo
 Results Book – Judo (Archived version)

Universiade
2019 Summer Universiade events
2019
Judo competitions in Italy